Highway 20, also known as the Chilcotin Highway, and officially dubbed the Alexander MacKenzie Highway, is one of the two main East-West routes in the Central Interior of British Columbia (the other being Highway 16 (the Yellowhead Highway). The Chilcotin Highway runs 457 km (284 mi) from Williams Lake westward through the Chilcotin region to North Bentinck Arm, an inlet from the Pacific Ocean where the town of Bella Coola is located. As of 2006, all but 57 km (35 mi) has been paved, mostly for expediting the removal of timber from the region, which, like most of British Columbia, is afflicted with pine beetle infestations.  Logging traffic and ranch-related traffic on the route can be expected.

Highway 20 is famous for the portion of the westernmost stretch, between Anahim Lake and Bella Coola, known as the Hill or The Precipice. From the point where the road crosses the Coast Range via Heckman Pass in Tweedsmuir South Provincial Park at an elevation of 1487 m (4879 ft) the road descends 43 km (27 mi) of steep,  narrow road with sharp hairpin turns and two major switchbacks to the Bella Coola Valley.  The descent includes a 9 km (5.6 mi) section with grades of up to 18% (about 1 in 6). The road is winding, in some places only wide enough for one vehicle, and in many places bordered on one side by cliffs and on the other side by a drop of hundreds of meters (many hundreds of feet) unprotected by guardrails. Tourists who have driven to Bella Coola from Williams Lake have been known to refuse to drive back and have had to be taken out by boat or float plane.

Until 1953 Highway 20 ended at Anahim Lake, 137 km (85 mi) from Bella Coola. The province considered the terrain too difficult and refused to extend it, leaving Bella Coola inaccessible by road. The road, known at the time as the "Freedom Road", was completed by local volunteers working from opposite ends with two bulldozers and supplies bought on credit.  The two bulldozers met each other on the 26th of September 1953 and an official opening ceremony was held on the 18th of July 1955.

Route Details
Highway 20 is scenic and very sparsely populated.  It begins in Williams Lake at its juncture with Highway 97. It rises gradually for 23 km (14 mi) to the crossing of the Fraser River at Sheep Creek Bridge, from which it ascends via a series of steep switchbacks to the Chilcotin Plateau.  Prior to improvements of the late 20th Century, including the Sheep Creek Bridge, it crossed the Fraser via a 1910s style suspension bridge, which was like those farther south at Gang Ranch-Dog Creek and Lillooet.

At 36 km (22 mi) it passes the Williams Lake LORAN-C Tower, part of the maritime navigation system. This tower was dismantled in October 2011.

At 52 km (32 mi) it passes through Riske Creek (population 165) then at 94 km (58 mi) the hamlet of Hanceville (population 68).

Around 104 km (64 mi) it passes Anahim Reserve, a Chilcotin community before reaching Alexis Creek (population 317) at 114 km (71 mi). From Alexis Creek it is 122 km (76 mi) to the next town, Tatla Lake (population 147).

54 km (34 mi) farther West is Nimpo Lake which serves as a float plane base for the region. Just west of Nimpo Lake the highway crosses the Dean River before reaching Anahim Lake (population 163) and the adjacent Indian reserve at 310 km (193 mi). 35 km (22 mi) west of Anahim Lake, the highway enters Tweedsmuir South Provincial Park, and 6.2 km (3.9 mi) later, it crosses into the Central Coast Regional District at Heckman Pass.  After another 20 km (12 mi), the highway meets the Atnarko River, and follows it west for 18 km (11 mi) to where the Atnarko merges with the Talchako River to form the Bella Coola River.  Highway 20 then follows the Bella Coola River for 10 km (6 mi) to a bridge over Burnt Bridge Creek, at which point it exits the Park.  After continuing to follow the Bella Coola River for another 27 km (17 mi), the highway reaches Hagensborg, then another 20 km (12 mi) to the centre of Bella Coola (population 2500), and then another 4.8 km (3.0 mi) to the BC Ferry terminal.

Gallery

References

External links
http://www.bcadventure.com/adventure/explore/cariboo/cities/hwy20.htm

020
Central Coast of British Columbia
Chilcotin Country